Babuška or Babuska  may refer to:
36060 Babuška, an asteroid
Ivo Babuška, a Czech mathematician 
Babuska, a minor character in a 2020 comedy Borat Subsequent Moviefilm

See also

Babushka (disambiguation)